The 2011–12 Wofford Terriers men's basketball team represented Wofford College during the 2011–12 NCAA Division I men's basketball season. The Terriers, led by 10th year head coach Mike Young, played their home games at Benjamin Johnson Arena and are members of the South Division of the Southern Conference. The Terriers finished the season 19–14, 12–6 in SoCon play. They were invited to the 2012 College Basketball Invitational where they lost in the first round.

Roster

Schedule

|-
!colspan=9| Regular Season

|-
!colspan=9| SoCon tournament

|-
!colspan=9| 2012 CBI

References

Wofford
Wofford Terriers men's basketball seasons
Wofford
Wolf
Wolf